Prabumulih is a city in South Sumatra, Indonesia. It has an area of 456.89 km² and had a population of 161,814 at the 2010 Census and 193,196 at the 2020 Census. Geographically, this city is located at 3°25′58″S 104°14′8″E in the heart of the province, and is surrounded on all sides by Muara Enim Regency apart from a short stretch bordering Penukal Abab Lematang Ilir Regency.

City borders

Administrative districts
Prabumulih is administratively divided into six districts (kecamatan), tabulated below with their areas and their populations at the 2010 Census and the 2020 Census. The table also includes the number of administrative villages (rural desa and urban kelurahan) in each district, and its postal codes.

Economy 
Prabumulih is one of main producers of crude oil and natural gas in South Sumatra. The city is known as "kota nanas" (Pineapple City) because this is known as a centre for pineapple production in the region.

Airports 
There used to be an airport in Prabumulih, which is no longer active.

References

External links 
  
  Prabumulih blogger

Populated places in South Sumatra
Cities in Indonesia
Cities in South Sumatra